Panuhat is a census town in Katwa I CD Block of Katwa subdivision in Purba Bardhaman district in the Indian state of West Bengal.

Geography

Location

Urbanisation
88.44% of the population of Katwa subdivision live in the rural areas. Only 11.56% of the population live in the urban areas. The map alongside presents some of the notable locations in the subdivision. All places marked in the map are linked in the larger full screen map.

Demographics
As per the 2011 Census of India, Panuhat had a total population of 6,473 of which 3,354 (52%) were males and 3,119 (48%) were females. Population below 6 years was 650. The total number of literates in  Panuhat was 4,817 (82.72% of the population over 6 years).

 India census, Panuhat had a population of 5,665. Males constitute 51% of the population and females 49%. Panuhat has an average literacy rate of 60%, higher than the national average of 59.5%: male literacy is 67%, and female literacy is 54%. In Panuhat, 12% of the population is under 6 years of age.

Infrastructure
As per the District Census Handbook 2011, Panuhat covered an area of 1.03 km2. It had 62 km roads. Amongst the medical facilities, both the nearest nursing home and veterinary hospital were 4 km away. Amongst the educational facilities it had were 5 primary schools, 1 middle school and 1 secondary school. The nearest senior secondary school was at Katwa 2 km away.

Transport
Panuhat is off State Highway 14 (locally called Katwa-Kalna Road). Katwa railway station is nearby.

Education
Panuhat has four primary and one secondary schools.

References

Cities and towns in Purba Bardhaman district